USS LST-835 was an  built for the United States Navy during World War II. Late in her career, she was renamed Hillsdale County (LST-835) – after Hillsdale County, Michigan, the only U.S. Naval vessel to bear the name – but saw no active service under that name.

Originally laid down as LST-835 by the American Bridge Company of Ambridge, Pennsylvania on 6 September 1944; launched on 25 October 1944; sponsored by Mrs. I. Raphael; and commissioned on 20 November.

Service history

World War II, 1944–1945
Following shakedown off Florida, LST-835 loaded ammunition at New Orleans and departed there on 28 December. After brief stops on the West Coast and Pearl Harbor, she steamed for the western Pacific, arriving Guam on 18 March 1945. For the next six weeks she transported troops, trucks, and other equipment from the Marianas to Iwo Jima. Sailing from Saipan on 25 April, LST-835 carried vital ammunition to Okinawa, where American forces were engaged in a fierce battle for control of this strategic island. For the remainder of World War II, the landing ship shuttled cargo and troops throughout the American staging areas in the Pacific.

1945–1989
After V-J Day she operated with the occupation forces in the Philippines and Japan for the next two months. Departing Nagoya, Japan on 8 November, LST-835 stopped for cargo at Saipan before proceeding to the United States. She arrived at San Francisco on 8 January 1946 and later that month sailed to Astoria, Oregon and decommissioned there. While berthed with the Columbia River Group, Pacific Reserve Fleet, LST-835 was renamed USS Hillsdale County (LST-835) on 1 July 1955.

Japanese service

Hillsdale County was struck from the Naval Vessel Register in October 1959 and sold in April 1961 to Japan to serve as JDS Shimokita (LST-4002). Resold to the Philippines, and named BRP Cavite (LT-509), the ship was scrapped in 1989.

LST-835 received one battle star for World War II service.

References

 

LST-542-class tank landing ships
Ships built in Ambridge, Pennsylvania
1944 ships
World War II amphibious warfare vessels of the United States
LST-542-class tank landing ships of the Japan Maritime Self-Defense Force
LST-542-class tank landing ships of the Philippine Navy
Hillsdale County, Michigan